This list reflects the state of the mainline Iranian Navy, and does not include the vessels of the Islamic Revolutionary Guard Corps Navy.

List

See also 

 List of equipment of the Navy of the Islamic Revolutionary Guard Corps
 List of former Iranian naval vessels

References 

 

Lists of ships of Iran
 
Ships